Curtoceras is a genus in the tarphycerid family Trocholitidae found widespread in the late Early and Middle Ordovician of North America and northern Europe. Curtoceras has a shell that is gradually expanded, with half the fully mature body chamber divergent from the preceding volution. Whorl sections are near equidimentional with the inner margin (dosum) moderately impressed. The surface may be smooth or weakly ribbed. The siphuncle is ventral in the initial chamber and becomes dorsal after one volution. With the exception of the dorsal siphuncle, Curtoceras is somewhat similar to the tarphyceratid Campbelloceras

See also
List of nautiloids

References
Furnish, W.M. and Glenister, Brian F 1964; Nautiloidea -Tarphycerida, in Treatise on Invertebrate Paleontology, Part K, Nautiloidea; Geological Society of America and University of Kansas press.

Tarphycerida
Early Ordovician first appearances
Middle Ordovician extinctions
Paleozoic life of Quebec
Prehistoric nautiloid genera